Sarkand-e Dizaj (also Romanized as Sarkand-e Dīzaj and Sarkand Dīzaj; also known as Bas Kandīzaj, Sarkandīzaj, Sarkandīzeh, Sarkaydiza, Sarkdīzaj, and Sūchān Dīzeh) is a village in Mishu-e Jonubi Rural District, Sufian District, Shabestar County, East Azerbaijan Province, Iran. At the 2006 census, its population was 728, in 247 families.

References 

Populated places in Shabestar County